Leptostomias gladiator is a species of fish in the family Stomiidae (barbeled dragonfish). It is sometimes called the scaleless dragonfish, but that name is shared with many other species.

Description
Leptostomias gladiator has a slender body, blackish brown to deep black. The bulb of its barbel is creamy yellow, and its photophores are violet. Its length is maximum . It has 19–22 dorsal soft rays and 23–29 anal soft rays. It has 77 vertebrae.

Habitat
Leptostomias gladiator lives in non-polar oceans worldwide.

Behaviour
Leptostomias gladiator eats lanternfish.

References

Stomiidae
Fish described in 1911
Taxa named by Erich Zugmayer